The Roman Catholic Diocese of Ji'an/Kian is a diocese located in the city of Ji'an (Jiangxi) in the Ecclesiastical province of Nanchang in China.

History
 August 19, 1879: Established as the Apostolic Vicariate of Southern Kiangsi 江西南境 from the Apostolic Vicariate of Kiangsi 江西
 August 25, 1920: Renamed as Apostolic Vicariate of Jing’an 吉安
 December 3, 1924: Renamed as Apostolic Vicariate of Ji’anfu 吉安府
 April 11, 1946: Promoted as Diocese of Ji’an 吉安

Leadership
 Bishops of Ji'an 吉安 (Roman rite)
 Bishop Gaetano Mignani, C.M. (April 11, 1946 – January 29, 1973)
 Vicars Apostolic of Ji'anfu 吉安府 (Roman Rite)
 Bishop Gaetano Mignani, C.M. (October 15, 1931 – April 11, 1946)
 Bishop Nicola Ciceri, C.M. (July 3, 1907 – October 15, 1931)
 Vicars Apostolic of Southern Kiangsi 江西南境 (Roman Rite)
 Bishop Jules-Auguste Coqset, C.M. (順其衡) (June 29, 1887 – May 3, 1907)
 Bishop Adrien-François Rouger, C.M. (September 7, 1883 – March 31, 1887)

References

 GCatholic.org
 Catholic Hierarchy

Roman Catholic dioceses in China
Religious organizations established in 1879
Roman Catholic dioceses and prelatures established in the 19th century
Religion in Jiangxi
Ji'an